Young, Nazi and Proud is a documentary programme on the youth wing of the British National Party (BNP), produced in the UK by David Modell for the Channel 4 television series Dispatches. It was originally broadcast on 4 November 2002 as the eight episode of the sixteenth season. The documentary won a BAFTA award in the 'Best Current Affairs' category.

The program focuses on then-chairman of Young BNP, Mark Collett. Interviews highlighted the ideological background of Collett, particularly his sympathetic stance towards the policies of Nazism and Adolf Hitler.

External links
 Official preview at David Modell Productions
 Young, Nazi and Proud at IMDb
 Young, Nazi and Proud at Channel 4
 Young, Nazi and Proud at BFI Film & TV Database

Channel 4 original programming
Neo-Nazism in the United Kingdom
British National Party